Platytes albipennella is a moth in the family Crambidae. It was described by George Hampson in 1896. It is found in the Punjab region of what was British India.

References

Crambini
Moths described in 1896
Moths of Asia